Joliet is an unincorporated community in Caldwell County, in the U.S. state of Texas. According to the Handbook of Texas, there were no population estimates made available to the community in 2000. It is located within the Greater Austin metropolitan area.

History
H.A. Loehman was one of the first to settle in Joliet and built a home on Plum Creek in 1846. A post office was established at Joliet in 1901 and remained in operation until 1903. It was then served by a later rural mail route. A small boom occurred in the community after oil was discovered there in 1923 but faded in the 1930s. It only had 10 inhabitants in the early 1930s. It had separate churches for African American, Mexican American, and White people living in the community in the 1940s. There were several businesses and homes featured on county highway maps. In the late 1980s, the community was marked by a church and three cemeteries on county maps. These, along with a few houses and pump jacks, remain in the community today.

Geography
Joliet stands at the intersection of Farm to Market Roads 671 and 2984, seven miles northwest of Luling in southwest-central Caldwell County.

Education
In the 1940s there were separate school campuses for African American, Mexican American, and White students living in Joliet. Today the community is served by the Luling Independent School District.

References

Unincorporated communities in Caldwell County, Texas
Unincorporated communities in Texas